Proctor is an English occupational surname, originally meaning 'steward', derived from Latin procurare ("to manage"). 

Notable people with the name include:

 Alexander Phimister Proctor (1860–1950), American sculptor
 Andy Proctor, English rugby league footballer
 Andrew Beauchamp-Proctor (1894–1921), South African RAF officer
 Barbara Gardner Proctor (born 1933), first African American woman to own and operate an advertising agency
 Bernard E. Proctor (1901–1959), American food scientist
 Carlos Proctor (1907–1983), American college football player and coach
 Carolina Isakson Proctor (1930–2012), wife of 27th President of Colombia, Virgilio Barco Vargas
 David Proctor (disambiguation)
 Dennis Proctor (1905–1983), British civil servant
 Dick Proctor (born 1941), Canadian activist
 Dorothy Proctor, Canadian author and activist
 Edna Dean Proctor (1829–1923), American poet
 Edward Proctor (1870–1944), English footballer
 Elaine Proctor (born 1960), South African film director, screenwriter, novelist, and actress
 Elizabeth Proctor (born 1652), American, figure of the Salem Witch Trials
 Eustace Proctor (born 1965), Anguillan cricketer 
 F. F. Proctor (1851–1929), American vaudeville impresario
 Fletcher D. Proctor (1860–1911), American businessman and politician, 51st Governor of Vermont (1906–1908)
 Ford Proctor (born 1996), American baseball player
 Frank M. Proctor (1827/1828–1892), American lawyer and politician
 George Proctor (disambiguation)
 Harvey Proctor (born 1947), British politician
 Haydn Proctor (1903–1996), American politician and judge
 H. Dean Proctor (born  1942), American politician
 Henry Proctor,  alternative spelling for British Major-General Henry Procter (British Army officer) (c.1763 – 1822) who invaded the Michigan Territory during the War of 1812
 Henry Proctor (rower) (1929–2005), American rower
 Henry H. Proctor (1868–1933), minister of the First Congregational Church in Atlanta
 Howard Proctor (died 1938), American politician and manufacturer
 James Proctor (disambiguation)
 Jamie Proctor (born 1992), English football striker
 Jesse Proctor (1908–2001), Archdeacon of Warwick (1958–1974)
 John Proctor (disambiguation), multiple people
 Joseph Proctor (disambiguation), multiple people 
 Kevin Proctor (born 1989), Australian rugby league player
 Kristin Proctor (born 1978), Norwegian-American actress
 Lionel Proctor (born 1979), Australian rules footballer
 Lyndsay Proctor, New Zealand rugby league player
 Mark Proctor (disambiguation), multiple people
 Mary Proctor (1862–1957), American astronomer
 Mary Proctor (artist) (born 1960), African American folk artist
 Matt Proctor (born 1992), New Zealand rugby union player 
 Mel Proctor (born 1951), American sports broadcaster
 Michael Proctor (disambiguation), multiple people
 Montagu Proctor-Beauchamp (1860–1939), British Christian missionary
 Mortimer R. Proctor (1889–1968), American politician, 66th Governor of Vermont (1945–1947)
 Pat Proctor, United States Army colonel, writer, and wargame developer
 Philip Proctor (born 1940), American actor
 Philip Bridger Proctor (1870–1940), British civil servant, Director of Meat Supplies, Ministry of Food (1919–1921)
 R. David Proctor (born 1960), United States District Judge
 Rachel Proctor (born 1974), American country singer-songwriter
 Red Proctor (1900–1954), Major League Baseball pitcher
 Redfield Proctor (1831–1908), American politician, former Governor of Vermont
 Redfield Proctor Jr. (1879–1957), American politician
 Richard A. Proctor (1837–1888), British astronomer
 Robert Proctor (disambiguation), multiple people
 Samuel Proctor (1919–2005), American historian
 Samuel DeWitt Proctor (1921–1997), American minister, educator, and civil rights activist
 Scot and Maurine Proctor, American couple, founders of the Latter-day Saint oriented website Meridian Magazine
 Scott Proctor (born 1977), American baseball player
 Senna Proctor (born 1998), British racing driver
 Shane Proctor (born 1985), American world champion bull rider (2011)
 Shara Proctor (born 1988), Anguillan-British long-jumper
 Shinelle Proctor (born 1991), Anguillan sprinter
 Sian Proctor, American science communicator
 Simon Proctor (born 1959), British composer, pianist, and flutist
 Susie Proctor (born 1940), American politician
 Tammy M. Proctor, American historian
 Thea Proctor (1879–1966), Australian artist
 Thomas Proctor (disambiguation), multiple people
 Toby Proctor, Canadian actor and voice actor
 W. Stanley Proctor (born 1939), American painter and sculptor
 Wayne Proctor (born 1972), Welsh rugby union player
 Wayne Proctor (rugby league), British rugby league player
 Wilfred Proctor (1893–1980), English football winger
 Willard L. Proctor (1915–1998), American racehorse trainer
 William Beauchamp-Proctor (1781–1861), British Royal Navy officer
 Sir William Beauchamp-Proctor, 1st Baronet (1722–1773), British politician
 William Proctor (disambiguation)
 Xavier Proctor (born 1990), American football player
 Luke Proctor (2007), (disambiguation)

Fictional characters
 Sgt./Lt. Carl Proctor, from the Police Academy franchise
 Graeme Proctor, from the British ITV soap opera, Coronation Street
 Kaz Proctor, main character in the television series Wentworth
 Paula Proctor, in the television series Crazy Ex-Girlfriend
 Proctor (comics), Marvel Comics character

See also 

 Procter, a surname

References

English-language surnames
Occupational surnames
English-language occupational surnames